Trippier is a surname. Notable people with the surname include:

 David Trippier (born 1945), British politician and author
 Kieran Trippier (born 1990), English footballer

English-language surnames